Synemon is a genus of moths within the family Castniidae. It was described by Edward Doubleday in 1846. The genus contains 24 described and 20 undescribed species.

Species
The genus includes the following species:

 Synemon austera Meyrick, 1891
 Synemon brontias Meyrick, 1891
 Synemon catocaloides Walker, 1865
 Synemon collecta Swinhoe, 1892
 Synemon directa Westwood, 1877
 Synemon discalis Strand, 1911
 Synemon gratiosa Westwood, 1877
 Synemon heliopis Meyrick, 1891
 Synemon jcaria R. Felder, 1874
 Synemon laeta Walker, 1854
 Synemon leucospila Meyrick, 1891
 Synemon magnifica Strand, 1911
 Synemon maja Strand, 1911
 Synemon nais Klug, 1850
 Synemon notha Westwood, 1877
 Synemon nupta Westwood, 1877
 Synemon obscurella Westwood, 1877
 Synemon parthenoides R. Felder, 1874
 Synemon phaeoptila Turner, 1906
 Synemon plana Walker, 1854
 Synemon selene Klug, 1850
 Synemon sophia (White, 1841)
 Synemon theresa Doubleday, 1846
 Synemon wulwulam Angel, 1951

References

Castniidae